Kalven is a surname. Notable people with the surname include:

Harry Kalven (1914–1974), American jurist
Janet Kalven (1913–2014), American Catholic educator and writer

See also
 Kallen
 Kalven